Harvey James Gilmour (born 15 December 1998) is an English professional footballer who plays as a midfielder for National League side F.C. Halifax Town.

Career
Gilmour began his career with Sheffield United, moving on loan to Tranmere Rovers in July 2018. He made his English Football League debut on 11 August 2018. After scoring 3 goals in 23 appearances, the loan deal was made permanent in January 2019. He was released by the club at the end of the 2019–20 season. He joined Stockport County on a short-term contract on 22 August 2020. In July 2021 he moved to F.C. Halifax Town.

Personal life
He went to Meadowhead Secondary School in Sheffield from 2010 to 2015.

Career statistics

Honours
Tranmere Rovers
EFL League Two play-offs: 2019

References

1998 births
Living people
English footballers
Association football midfielders
Sheffield United F.C. players
Tranmere Rovers F.C. players
Stockport County F.C. players
FC Halifax Town players
English Football League players
National League (English football) players